Nishonoseki stable may refer to:
 Nishonoseki stable (1911–2013)
 Nishonoseki stable (2021)